Somatina chalyboeata is a moth of the  family Geometridae. It is found in the Democratic Republic of Congo and Ghana.

References

Moths described in 1869
Scopulini
Insects of West Africa
Fauna of the Republic of the Congo
Moths of Africa